The 2015 NatWest t20 Blast was the second season of the NatWest t20 Blast, the English and Welsh Twenty20 cricket competition. The competition ran from 15 May 2015 to Finals Day at Edgbaston on 29 August. The competition was won for the first time by Lancashire Lightning, who defeated Northamptonshire Steelbacks in the final.

Format
The 18 teams are divided into two groups of nine. In the style of a round-robin tournament, each team will play six other teams in their group both home and away. The other two teams will be faced just once. The top four teams from each group qualify for the knockout stage: a three-round single-elimination tournament. The winner of each group will have a home match in the quarter-finals against the fourth team from the other group. The runners-up from each group will play at home against the third placed team from the other group. The semi-finals will be a free draw from all the qualified teams. Finals Day will be again be held at Edgbaston.

Teams

North Division

Table

Results

Fixtures
All times are BST.

May

June

July

South Division

Table

Results

Fixtures
All times are BST.

May

June

July

Knockout stage

Quarter-finals

Semifinals

Final

Statistics

Highest team totals
The following table lists the five highest team scores in the season.

Most runs
The top five highest run scorers (total runs) in the season are included in this table.

Highest scores
This table contains the top five highest scores of the season made by a batsman in a single innings.

Most wickets
The following table contains the five leading wicket-takers of the season.

Best bowling figures
This table lists the top five players with the best bowling figures.

See also
2015 Royal London One-Day Cup
2015 County Championship

References

External links
Tournament Site – Cricinfo

NatWest t20 Blast
NatWest t20 Blast
NatWest t20 Blast
2015
NatWest t20 Blast